John Tzibus or Joannes Tzibus was a general of the Byzantine emperor Justinian I.  He served as the magister militum per Armeniam, replacing the unpopular Peter by 535 at the latest. He founded the port city of Petra, Lazica, through which he monopolized the trade in Lazica, acting as a middleman. This triggered the Lazic king Gubazes II to switch sides. John Tzibus was killed by an arrow in the neck in 541 AD during the siege of his fortress by the Sasanians, who were now allied with the Lazic king. This marked the beginning of the Lazic War between the Sasanians and the Byzantines.

References

Generals of Justinian I
Medieval merchants
Magistri militum
541 deaths
Year of birth unknown
Byzantine businesspeople
Byzantines killed in battle
6th-century Byzantine military personnel
Lazic War
People of the Roman–Sasanian Wars
Deaths by arrow wounds
Petra, Lazica
City founders
6th-century businesspeople